Campanula pulla, the solitary harebell, is a species of flowering plant in the family Campanulaceae, native to the northeastern Alps of Austria.
 A spreading, mat-forming perennial, the Royal Horticultural Society recommends it for scree gardens. It is available from commercial suppliers. There appear to be cultivars or selections; 'Blue Drops' and 'Alba', and a hybrid with Campanula carpatica; Campanula × pulloides, which itself has cultivars, 'Jelly Bells', and 'G.F. Wilson', which has gained the RHS Award of Garden Merit.

References

pulla
Endemic flora of Austria
Taxa named by Carl Linnaeus
Plants described in 1753